Edward  Zorinsky (November 11, 1928March 6, 1987) was an American politician who served as a Democrat in the U.S. Senate from 1976 until his death in 1987. He represented Nebraska and had previously served as mayor of Omaha, elected as a Republican. He was the first Jew elected to statewide office in Nebraska.

Early life and career
Zorinsky was born and raised in Omaha. His parents were Sonia (née Feldman) and Hymie Zorinsky, both Russian Jewish immigrants. He attended Saunders and Rosehill elementary schools and graduated from Central High School in 1945. Zorinsky attended the University of Minnesota (1945–1946) and Creighton University (1946–1948) before completing his studies at the University of Nebraska, where he received a Bachelor of Science degree in chemistry and zoology in 1949.

For twenty-three years, Zorinsky worked in the wholesale tobacco and candy business. He also served in the U.S. Army Reserve from 1949 to 1962. He enrolled at Harvard University in 1966 to pursue his graduate work, and later served as a member of the Nebraska Judicial Qualifications Commission (1968–1971) and of the Board of Directors for Omaha Public Power District (1969–1973). From 1973 to 1976, he served as Mayor of Omaha. He earned a great deal of popularity due to his response to a blizzard and a series of tornadoes that hit Omaha in 1975.

U.S. Senate

In 1976, Zorinsky, a lifelong Republican, decided to run for the U.S. Senate after 22-year incumbent Roman Hruska decided not to seek re-election. However, when it became apparent that he would not win the Republican nomination, he switched parties and ran as a conservative Democrat. He defeated Hess Dyas, a former state party chairman, for the Democratic nomination. In the general election, he defeated U.S. Representative John Y. McCollister by a margin of 53%–47%. With his victory, he became the first Democratic Senator elected from Nebraska since 1934 and the first Jew ever to win a statewide election in Nebraska.

Days before the end of his term, Hruska resigned from the Senate on December 27, 1976, and Governor J. James Exon appointed Zorinsky to the seat he had won in November. He was re-elected to a second term in 1982, receiving over 66% of the vote. As a Senator, Zorinsky was a moderate to conservative Democrat, voting with Republicans on some significant issues. He was courted by the Republicans to rejoin their party in 1982. Zorinsky threatened to change parties in 1986, but ultimately never made the switch. Zorinsky served as chairman of the Senate Subcommittee on Western Hemisphere Affairs, in which position he advocated for financial and military assistance to the new Sandinista National Liberation Front regime in Nicaragua in 1979.

Zorinsky died after suffering a heart attack at the 1987 Omaha Press Club gridiron show, shortly after performing a song and dance routine. After his death, one of the largest man-made lakes in Nebraska was named after him: Ed Zorinsky Lake and the surrounding Zorinsky Lake Park are located in the city of Omaha. The Edward Zorinsky Federal Building in Omaha is also named in his honor.

See also
List of Jewish members of the United States Congress
List of United States Congress members who died in office (1950–99)

References

External links

 

1928 births
1987 deaths
Mayors of Omaha, Nebraska
Nebraska Democrats
University of Minnesota alumni
Creighton University alumni
University of Nebraska alumni
Harvard University alumni
American people of Russian-Jewish descent
Jews and Judaism in Omaha, Nebraska
Jewish United States senators
Jewish mayors of places in the United States
Nebraska Republicans
Democratic Party United States senators from Nebraska
Jewish American military personnel
United States Army reservists
20th-century American politicians
Burials at Beth El Cemetery (Ralston, Nebraska)
Jewish American people in Nebraska politics
Omaha Central High School alumni
20th-century American Jews